Murple can refer to:

 Jim Murple Memorial, a ska band from France
 Mabel Murple, a book by author Sheree Fitch
 Murple, an Italian progressive rock band